Kianyaga is a small town in Kenya's Central Province.

It is the district headquarters for the Kirinyaga East district, in Central Province. Kianyaga once used to be the divisional headquarters for Gichugu division. It hosts the General Kassam Stadium-Kianyaga named after the Lt Mau Mau war Hero and General Kassam Njogu.

References 

Populated places in Central Province (Kenya)